In enzymology, a 5-carboxymethyl-2-hydroxymuconic-semialdehyde dehydrogenase is an enzyme that catalyzes the chemical reaction

5-carboxymethyl-2-hydroxymuconate semialdehyde + H2O + NAD+  5-carboxymethyl-2-hydroxymuconate + NADH + 2 H+

The 3 substrates of this enzyme are 5-carboxymethyl-2-hydroxymuconate semialdehyde, H2O, and NAD+, whereas its 3 products are 5-carboxymethyl-2-hydroxymuconate, NADH, and H+.

This enzyme belongs to the family of oxidoreductases, specifically those acting on the aldehyde or oxo group of donor with NAD+ or NADP+ as acceptor.  The systematic name of this enzyme class is 5-carboxymethyl-2-hydroxymuconic-semialdehyde:NAD+ oxidoreductase. This enzyme is also called carboxymethylhydroxymuconic semialdehyde dehydrogenase.  This enzyme participates in tyrosine metabolism.

Structural studies 

As of late 2007, only one structure has been solved for this class of enzymes, with the PDB accession code .

References 

 
 
 
 

EC 1.2.1
NADH-dependent enzymes
Enzymes of known structure